Vardavard Metro Station is a station in Tehran Metro Line 5. It is located north of Tehran-Karaj Freeway. It is between Iran Khodro Metro Station and Garmdare Metro Station.

References

Tehran Metro stations